Mikhaïl Suzumov (1893 - 1982) was a Soviet Russian historian, Doctor of Sciences in Historical Sciences (1954). He was a professor at the Ural State University.

His father was a veterinarian by profession.

In 1911 he became a student at University of Tartu, where he studied under prof. Alexander Vasiliev, and in 1916, he graduated. He is a Byzantine scholar. From 1918 he served in the Red Army in the 27th Rifle Division. From 1920 he lived in the city of Zlatoust. In 1938 he worked for Ural State Pedagogical University and in 1943, Suzumov defended his Candidate's Dissertation. His opponent was A. I. Neusykhin. In 1954, he defended his doctoral dissertation. In 1955, he received the title of professor. He headed the department of history at the Ural State University. He was also a philatelist.

Suzumov is the author more than 70 published scientific works. He published in Voprosy Istorii. He, like Mark Whittow later, developed the idea of continuity in Byzantium. (Whereas according to Cyril Mango, the idea of a single culture defining the period from 330 to 1453 is suspect.)

He was awarded Order of the Badge of Honour.

References

1893 births
1982 deaths
Russian professors
Soviet professors
Soviet Byzantinists
Soviet Marxist historians